Col des Mosses (elevation 1445 m) is a mountain pass in the western Bernese Alps of Switzerland. The pass is located in the municipality of Ormont-Dessous in the canton of Vaud. It links Aigle, to the south in the valley of the Rhone, with Château-d'Œx, to the north in the valley of the Sarine, and is flanked to the west by the Mont d'Or and to the east by the Pic Chaussy.

Road and public transports 
The pass is traversed by a major road between Aigle and Château-d'Œx. The road is normally kept open throughout the year. Swiss Post buses services cross the pass several times a day, connecting Château-d'Œx, which is on the Montreux–Oberland Bernois railway, and Le Sépey, on the Aigle–Sépey–Diablerets railway.

Sports 
The Col des Mosses is also on the Alpine Pass Route hiking trail, and is a winter sports centre. The Tour de France has crossed the Col des Mosses on five different occasions (in 1949, 1997, 2000, 2009 and 2016). The Tour de Romandie has crossed the col three times (in 2008, 2012 and 2013), and the Tour de Suisse just once (in 2010).

See also
 List of highest paved roads in Europe
 List of mountain passes
 List of the highest Swiss passes
 Lac Lioson

References

External links 

 Tourist Office
 Profile on climbbybike.com

Mosses
Mosses
Mountain passes of the canton of Vaud